Maison Louis Carré is a residential building in Bazoches-sur-Guyonne, France designed by Finnish modernist architects Elissa and Alvar Aalto. The house was designed for art collectors Olga and Louis Carré, and completed in 1959.

The building is the only remaining building by Aalto in France.

Maison Louis Carré was opened to the public in 2007 under the management of the Alvar Aalto Association.

Gallery

References 

Alvar Aalto buildings
Buildings and structures in Yvelines
Houses completed in 1959
20th-century architecture in France